The European Communities (EC) were three international organizations that were governed by the same set of institutions. These were the European Coal and Steel Community (ECSC), the European Atomic Energy Community (EAEC or Euratom), and the European Economic Community (EEC); the last of which was renamed the European Community (EC) in 1993 by the Maastricht Treaty establishing the European Union. The European Union was established at that time more as a concept rather than an entity, while the Communities remained the actual subjects of international law impersonating the rather abstract Union, becoming at the same time its first pillar. In the popular language, however, the singular European Community was sometimes inaccurately used interchangeably with the plural phrase, in the sense of referring to all three entities. The European Coal and Steel Community ceased to exist in 2002 when its founding treaty expired. The European Community was merged with the second and third EU pillars by the Treaty of Lisbon in 2009, finally allowing the European Union to move beyond being only a concept and to assume the shape of a legally incorporated international organization with juridical personality, designated as the legal successor to the Community. However, the reformed EU has not become entirely unified, because Euratom, though governed with the EU by the common set of institutions, has been retained as an entity distinct from the EU, along with a number of other international entities, such as the European Investment Bank, the European University Institute, the European Stability Mechanism, and the Unified Patent Court.

History

Three communities

The ECSC was created first. Following its proposal in 1950 in the Schuman Declaration, Belgium, France, Italy, Luxembourg, the Netherlands, and West Germany came together to sign the Treaty of Paris in 1951 which established the Community. The success of this Community led to the desire to create more, but attempts at creating a European Defence Community and a European Political Community failed leading to a return to economic matters. In 1957, the EAEC and EEC were created by the Treaties of Rome. They were to share some of the institutions of the ECSC but have separate executive structures.

The ECSC's aim was to combine the coal and steel industries of its members to create a single market in those resources. It was intended that this would increase prosperity and decrease the risk of these countries going to war through the process of European integration. The EAEC was working on nuclear energy co-operation between the members. The EEC was to create a customs union and general economic co-operation. It later led to the creation of a European single market.

The EEC became the European Community pillar of the EU, with the ECSC and EAEC continuing in a similar subordinate position, existing separately in a legal sense but governed by the institutions of the EU as if they were its own. The ECSC's treaty had a 50-year limit and thus expired in 2002; all its activities are now absorbed into the European Community. The EAEC had no such limit and thus continues to exist. Due to nuclear power being a very sensitive issue for the European electorate, the Euratom Treaty has gone without amendment since its signing, and was not even to be changed with the European Constitution intended to repeal all other treaties (the Constitution's replacement, the Treaty of Lisbon, likewise makes no attempt at amendment).

As the EAEC has a low profile, and the profile of the European Community is dwarfed by that of the EU, the term "European Communities" sees little usage. However, when the EU was established the institutions that dealt solely or mainly with the European Community (as opposed to all three pillars) retained their original names, for example the formal name of the European Court of Justice was the "Court of Justice of the European Communities" until 2009

In 1967, the Merger Treaty combined these separate executives. The Commission and Council of the EEC were to take over the responsibilities of its counterparts in the other organisations. From then on they became known collectively as the "European Communities", for example the commission was known as the "Commission of the European Communities", although the communities themselves remained separate in legal terms.

Structural evolution of the European Commission

Pillar

The Maastricht Treaty built upon the Single European Act and the Solemn Declaration on European Union in the creation of the European Union. The treaty was signed on 7 February 1992 and came into force on 1 November 1993. The emerging Union integrated the European Communities as its institutional core and one of its three pillars. The first Commission President following the creation of the EU was Jacques Delors, who briefly continued his previous EEC tenure before handing over to Jacques Santer in 1994.

The first pillar was the only one established according to then-innovative principles of supranationalism. The pillar structure of the EU allowed the areas of European co-operation to be increased without leaders handing a large amount of power to supranational institutions. The pillar system segregated the EU. What were formerly the competencies of the EEC fell within the European Communities pillar. Justice and Home Affairs was introduced as a new pillar while European Political Cooperation became the second pillar (the Common Foreign and Security Policy).

The Communities institutions became the institutions of the EU but the roles of the institutions between the pillars are different. The commission, Parliament and Court of Justice are largely cut out of activities in the second and third pillars, with the Council dominating proceedings. This is reflected in the names of the institutions, the council is formally the "Council of the European Union" while the commission is formally the "Commission of the European Communities". This allowed the new areas to be based on intergovernmentalism (unanimous agreement between governments) rather than majority voting and independent institutions according to supranational democracy.

However, after the Treaty of Maastricht, Parliament gained a much bigger role. Maastricht brought in the codecision procedure, which gave it equal legislative power with the Council on Community matters. Hence, with the greater powers of the supranational institutions and the operation of Qualified Majority Voting in the council, the Communities pillar could be described as a far more federal method of decision making.

The Amsterdam Treaty transferred rule making powers for border controls, immigration, asylum and cooperation in civil and commercial law from the Justice and Home Affairs (JHA) pillar to the European Community (JHA was renamed Police and Judicial Co-operation in Criminal Matters (PJCC) as a result). Both Amsterdam and the Treaty of Nice also extended codecision procedure to nearly all policy areas, giving Parliament equal power to the Council in the Community.

In 2002, the Treaty of Paris which established the European Coal and Steel Community (one of the three communities which comprised the European Communities) expired, having reached its 50-year limit (as the first treaty, it was the only one with a limit). No attempt was made to renew its mandate; instead, the Treaty of Nice transferred certain of its elements to the Treaty of Rome and hence its work continued as part of the EC area of the Communities remit.

The Treaty of Lisbon merged the three pillars and abolished the European Community; with the European Union becoming the Community's legal successor. Only one of the three European Communities still exists, thus making the designation of "European Communities" obsolete.

The abolition of the pillar structure was proposed already under the European Constitution which ultimately failed to pass the ratification process.

EU evolution timeline

Institutions

By virtue of the Merger Treaty, all three Communities were governed by the same institutional framework. Prior to 1967, the Common Assembly/European Parliamentary Assembly and the Court of Justice, established by the ECSC, were already shared with the EEC and EAEC, but they had different executives. The 1967 treaty gave the Council and Commission of the EEC responsibility over ECSC and EAEC affairs, abolishing the Councils of the ECSC and EAEC, the Commission of the EAEC and the High Authority of the ECSC. These governed the three Communities until the establishment of the European Union in 1993.

Members

The three Communities shared the same membership, the six states that signed the Treaty of Paris and subsequent treaties were known as the "Inner Six" (the "outer seven" were those countries who formed the European Free Trade Association). The six founding countries were France, West Germany, Italy and the three Benelux countries: Belgium, the Netherlands and Luxembourg. The first enlargement was in 1973, with the accession of Denmark, Ireland and the United Kingdom. Greece, Spain and Portugal joined in the 1980s. Following the creation of the EU in November 1993, it has enlarged to include a further sixteen countries by July 2013.

Member states are represented in some form in each institution. The Council is also composed of one national minister who represents their national government. Each state also has a right to one European Commissioner each, although in the European Commission they are not supposed to represent their national interest but that of the Community. Prior to 2004, the larger members (France, Germany, Italy and the United Kingdom) had two Commissioners. In the European Parliament, members are allocated a set number seats related to their population, however these (since 1979) have been directly elected and they sit according to political allegiance, not national origin. Most other institutions, including the European Court of Justice, have some form of national division of its members.

Policy areas

At the time of its abolition, the Community pillar covered the following areas;

Privileges and immunities
The Protocol on the privileges and immunities of the European Communities grants the European Communities and their institutions certain privileges and immunities such as to allow them to perform their tasks. The International Organizations Immunities Act (22 USC § 288h) of the United States has also been extended to the European Communities.

The working conditions of staff are governed by the Communities' staff regulations and not directly by the labour laws of the countries of employment. Their salaries, wages and emoluments are subject to a tax for the benefit of the European Communities and are, in turn, exempt from national taxes.

See also
 Accession of the United Kingdom to the European Communities
 Brussels and the European Union
 Delors Commission
 European institutions in Strasbourg
 Energy Community
 Location of European Union institutions

References

Further reading
 Monnet, Jean, Prospect for a New Europe (1959)
 Balassa, Bela, The Theory of Economic Integration (1962)
 Hallstein, Walter, A New Path to Peaceful Union (1962)
 Spaak, Paul-Henri, The Continuing Battle: Memories of a European (1971)

External links
 European Union website
 Treaty establishing the European Economic Community CVCE (Centre for European Studies)
 History of the Rome Treaties CVCE collection (Centre for European Studies)

History of the European Union
1950s in Europe
1960s in Europe
1970s in Europe
1980s in Europe
1990s in Europe
2000s in Europe